LRC may refer to:

Organizations

Academic
 La Roche College, a Catholic college in Pennsylvania
 Lenoir–Rhyne College, now Lenoir–Rhyne University in North Carolina
 Learning resource center, a term for a school library
 Learning Resource Centre (or Library Resource Centre), a British school library which also provides access to on-line resources
 Livingston Robotics Club, a robotics club in Livingston, New Jersey, US
 Lugar Research Center, a Tbilisi biological institute

Business
 Leicester Regeneration Company, a former Urban Regeneration Company in Leicester, UK
 London Rubber Company, a British company which distributed imported condoms, later part of SSL International, which is now part of Reckitt Benckiser 
 London Rail Concession, the franchising of railway services in London

Miscellaneous
 Learning Resource Center, a Flowserve training site
 Labour Representation Committee (1900), the historical predecessor of the British Labour Party
 Labour Representation Committee (2004), a modern pressure group within the British Labour Party
 Manitoba Labour Representation Committee (1912–1915), a former Canadian political group
 Lebanese Red Cross, a Lebanese humanitarian and non-profit organization
 Legal Resources Centre, a South African public-interest law organisation
 London Reception Centre, an MI5 processing location for aliens during World War II
 Law Revision Counsel, a U.S. Congressional office overseeing publication of the U.S. Code
 Logistics Readiness Center, a military project of the U.S. Joint Chiefs of Staff
 Linguistics Research Center at UT Austin, a research group at the University of Texas
 London Rowing Club, a British sports club

Media
 LetsRun.Com, a running news website and forum
 Left, Right & Center, a political public radio program
 LewRockwell.com, a libertarian news and commentary website
 Literary Review of Canada, a Canadian magazine of book reviews, essays and poetry

Science and technology
 Left-right confusion, the inability to accurately differentiate between left and right
 Leukocyte Receptor Complex, the gene cluster containing Leukocyte immunoglobulin-like receptors
 Longitudinal redundancy check, an error detection number calculated over a serial data stream
 Long Range Certificate, an internationally recognized certificate that entitles the holder to participate in marine and mobile radio telephony on leisure crafts
 LRC circuit, an inductance-resistance-capacitance circuit
 LRC (file format), a lyrics file format with time tags

Transport
 LRC, IATA code for Leicester Airport, near Leicester, UK
 Lorong Chuan MRT station, MRT station in Serangoon, Singapore, abbreviated to LRC
 Light, Rapid, Comfortable, a Bombardier passenger train used by Via Rail Canada
 Humber LRC (Light Reconnaissance Car), a British recon vehicle from WW2 
 Long range cruise, in aviation; for example see Bell UH-1Y Venom

Other uses
 Northern Luri language, the ISO 639-3 language code (lrc) 
 Leadership reaction course, for example at Joint Base Cape Cod